Collective Soul, also known as Rabbit to differentiate it from the band's 1995 album of the same name, is the eighth studio album by American rock band Collective Soul. It was released on August 25, 2009.

Background
Rabbit is Collective Soul's first release with a parent label since the group started its own independent El Music Group label in 2004. It also effectively marks their return to Atlantic Records, as that label purchased Roadrunner in 2006.

Rabbit includes two songs ("You" and "Understanding") that were written by all members in the band, a first for Collective Soul. According to the singer, guitarist and keyboard player Ed Roland: "I think it's the confidence that the other guys have gotten in their music skills and the songwriting and also, for lack of a better term, me letting go of my ego a little bit..."

Singles
The first single released from the album was "Staring Down", which was sent to radio stations on June 8, 2009, and was released on the iTunes Store on June 16, 2009. The second single, "Welcome All Again", was released on the iTunes Store on June 30, 2009, and was sent to radio stations on July 6, 2009. "Welcome All Again" is also in the "Shawn Takes a Shot in the Dark" episode of the TV series Psych.

Commercial performance
The album debuted at No. 24 on the Billboard 200, and No. 10 on the Top Rock Albums chart,  selling around 17,300 copies in its first week of release.  It also debuted at No. 9 on the Canadian Albums chart.

The album has sold 71,000 copies in the United States .

Track listing
All songs written by Ed Roland except where noted.

Digital deluxe edition bonus tracks
 "Staring Down" (acoustic) – 3:25
 "She Does" (piano version) – 3:02
 "Heart to Heart" – 3:09

Personnel
 Ed Roland – rhythm guitar, lead vocals
 Dean Roland – rhythm guitar
 Will Turpin – bass guitar, backing vocals
 Joel Kosche – lead guitar, occasional backing vocals
 Cheney Brannon – drums, percussion

Charts

References

2009 albums
Albums produced by Ed Roland
Collective Soul albums
Roadrunner Records albums